Fishing Creek is an unincorporated community and census-designated place (CDP) in Dorchester County, Maryland, United States, on Upper Hoopers Island. As of the 2010 census, the population of Fishing Creek was 163.

It is in area code 410, and ZIP code 21634.

Demographics

Description
Located on a narrow island served primarily by Hoopers Island Road, Fishing Creek has a restaurant (Old Salty's), a post office, and a general store (Hoopers Island General Store), as well as crabbing businesses which rely on seasonal workers. Local legend posits a number of ghosts in the Fishing Creek area.

In the media
Fishing Creek resident Louie "Rufus" Frase, 43 at the time, was a contestant on the summer 2007 CBS reality television series Pirate Master.

References

External links
HomeTownLocator: Fishing Creek (MD) - Community Profile
Restaurants in Fishing Creek
Ghosts of America: Spooky Ghost Tales from Fishing Creek, Maryland also known as Hoopersville (sic)

Crabbing communities in Maryland
Fishing communities in Maryland
Hoopers Island
Unincorporated communities in Dorchester County, Maryland
Unincorporated communities in Maryland
Maryland populated places on the Chesapeake Bay